Bence Sipos (born 7 April 1994) is a Hungarian professional footballer who plays for MTK Budapest FC.

Club statistics

Updated to games played as of 1 March 2014.

References
MLSZ 
HLSZ 

1994 births
Living people
Sportspeople from Eger
Hungarian footballers
Association football midfielders
MTK Budapest FC players
Szigetszentmiklósi TK footballers
Nemzeti Bajnokság I players